The trickle-up effect in the fashion field, also known as bubble-up pattern, is an innovative fashion theory, born in the late 1970s, that believes that new trends are to be found in the streets and that innovation flows from lower classes to upper ones. It is completely in contrast with classical theories of fashion consumption, such as the ones of Georg Simmel and Thorstein Veblen, according to which the upper classes are the ones who dictate the fashion flow.

Origins of the trickle-down and trickle-up effects 

The trickle-down effect can be seen as an antithesis to the trickle-up effect. Although the theory itself has only appeared since the 1950s under the title trickle-down effect, the concept can be traced back to Georg Simmel and Thorstein Veblen. It describes the inability of lower social classes to develop a fashion style of their own, as only upper social classes have the possibility to influence fashion. Lower social classes are therefore dependent on imitating the fashion of the rich.
In contrast to this, the concept of the trickle-up effect describes an upward diffusion in which fashion styles from lower classes are adopted by upper ones. In opposition to the diffusion of fashion in earlier years, we now encounter a phenomenon in which social strata that are primarily considered to be of lower social standing influence the fashion taste of the time. As the trickle-up effect becomes more and more influential for today’s fashion consumption, it is necessary to mention that it was firstly described by Paul Blumberg during the 1970s in the USA: "[…] there has been in the last decade more percolating up from the bottom than trickling down from the top". Blumberg elaborates on this by stating that a variety of standards in fashion have been set by the déclassé and anti-class youth by using new styles, like long hair or a shabby chic, to not only tease the status symbols of higher classes but also spreading their styles into the fashion elite.

History through iconic cases

T-shirt 
From the Middle Age to the early years of the 19th century the T-shirt only was considered as a piece of undergarment, which was mostly worn by Navy soldiers and blue-collar workers. By wearing this simple kind of clothing in two popular movies in the 50’s Marlon Brando and James Dean made it become an iconic fashion item. Apart from that they legitimized its use also as outerwear and created a sort of rebellious act. Due to its versatility and the possibility of printing messages on it, the T-shirt started to appear not only in the collections of low cost but also in those of high-end brands. Important examples are the "anti-nuclear"-T-shirt, which was worn by the designer Katharine Hamnett during a meeting with Margaret Thatcher, and the "We all should be feminists"-T-shirt, which was presented at Dior Fashion show in 2016.

Jeans
Initially, Levi Strauss' jeans were simply sturdy trousers worn by factory workers, miners, farmers, and cattlemen throughout the North American West. After James Dean popularized them in the movie Rebel Without a Cause, wearing jeans became a symbol of youth rebellion during the 1950s. During the 1960s the wearing of jeans became more acceptable, and by the 1970s it had become general fashion in the United States for casual wear.

Examples of intentional denim distressing strictly to make them more fashionable can be seen as early as 1935 in Vogue's June issue. Michael Belluomo, editor of Sportswear International Magazine, Oct/Nov 1987, P. 45, wrote that in 1965, Limbo, a boutique in the New York East Village, was "the first retailer to wash a new pair of jeans to get a used, worn effect, and the idea became a hit." He continued, "[Limbo] hired East Village artists to embellish the jeans with patches, decals, and other touches, and sold them for $200." In the early 1980s the denim industry introduced the stone-washing technique developed by GWG also known as "Great Western Garment Co." Donald Freeland of Edmonton, Alberta pioneered the method, which helped to bring denim to a larger and more versatile market. Acceptance of jeans continued through the 1980s and 1990s. Originally an esoteric fashion choice, in the 2010s jeans may be seen being worn by men and women of all ages.

Punk style 

Punk subculture appeared for the first time in the UK in the 1970s. Punk style started as a youth movement, in which the concept of "anti- fashion" was a main feature, due to its origin in the streets. Vivienne Westwood was the first designer who used this concept in her collections, which gave her the title "The Mother of Punk". She was the one who opened a popular shop in London, which was loved not only by the celebrities and music stars of the time but also by the rebellious punk band Sex Pistols. Studded chokers, tattoos, chains and ripped jeans were the main features of this way of dressing up. Thanks to Zandra Rhodes' designs in 1977 this style started to be widely appreciated because she added punk elements on elegant gowns: punk chic was born. Nowadays on catwalks (Versace is an example) it’s still possible to see many references to punk style, and this has a precise aim: that of protesting against problems of today’s society and the promotion of a rebellious spirit.

1970s and hippie fashion 
Born in the 1970s, the hippie style shifted from being just worn by the lower and middle-class alternative youth to a widespread trend. From 2012 it had a huge comeback with looks made of flow-y-tops and skirts paired with knit shrugs. An example is Ralph Lauren's spring collection (2011), which presented skirts with higher waist with the flow-y details towards the bottom. Moreover, hippie fashion, today also known as boho style, has also entered the popular imagination as a trendy style thanks to popular figures like the actress Vanessa Hudgens, and themed events like The Coachella Valley Music and Arts Festival.

1980s and yuppies fashion 
Another important example of trickling-up in fashion is given by the revival of some iconic 1980s yuppie-inspired pieces of clothing like kitten heels, pastel colors, white commuter sneakers, power shoulder and high waisted pants with skinny belts by major fashion houses like Ralph Lauren, Tory Burch, Dr. Martens Boots and Tibi.

1990s and grunge influence

The Grunge fashion, which is characterized by oversized plaid flannel shirts, ripped jeans, combat boots, choker necklaces, and dark colored sheer tights, was a consequence of the huge success of bands such as Nirvana and Soundgarden. The idea of wearing clothes that seemed inexpensive and already worn was re-proposed in the 1993 Spring collections by avant-garde designers like Marc Jacobs, Christian Francis Roth and Anna Sui. This caused a big disarray in the fashion industry.

Military-inspired clothing 
Military-inspired clothing first appeared after World War II when lower and middle-class young people started to buy pea jackets and khaki pants as a sign of independence and protest against war. The trend survived until today since Chanel, Balmain, Marc Jacobs, Celine, Hermes, Lanvin, D&G and Burberry are some of the fashion houses that proposed from 2010 military-inspired collections, which were enriched with garments and jewelry. Combat boots, leather studded bracelets, and double-breasted jackets with rows of buttons are pieces that can be easily found both in luxury runaways and in fast fashion chains.

Role of digital culture in trickle-up fashion 
While influencing the fashion industry was out of reach for an ordinary consumer, social media started to change this former two-dimensional, one-sided industry. Due to the fact that social media networks formed platforms, which gave new possibilities to people with a special interest in fashion, influencers meanwhile play an important role in agencies’ and brands’ marketing strategies. Those social media fashion icons can be seen as an example for the trickle-up effect in fashion, as they were able  to form trends and influence fashion by only using the opportunity of presenting their own fashion taste on free platforms like Instagram or Facebook. An example for that is the Italian influencer Chiara Ferragni, who started with a small blog and who is meanwhile not just seen as a fashion icon but also runs her own fashion business.

Key factors of social media in trickle-up fashion 
Fashion is currently a two-way route due to web digital space. Before the
digital era people had to go physically to Fashion weeks. Since the digitalization people who are interested in fashion can participate through social media platforms to latest trends. Apart from that digital based life has carried diversity to the industry because anyone can present him/herself and follow those who relate to them in body or lifestyle. Apart from that hashtags like for example #winterscarves #millennials or #winterfashion allow users to easily find virtually whatever trend they want.

From streetwear to the mainstream 
Veblen’s trickle-down theory was referring to the society of the 19th and 20th centuries, a time where people were trying to climb the social ladder by imitating the style of the rich. In difference to that the advent and spread of social media, made it possible for people who are not on the top of the social scale to be noticed and gave them the ability to express their style. Now they can create trends whenever and wherever. 
Apart from that designers now have online stores as main sales channels and maintain an active social media presence. Digital space is now a key place for brands to showcase collections, develop personalities and relationships with customers. 
According to that the history of trickle-up fashion and the influence of the digital world brought an evolution to the fashion industry. As particular styles began to draw attention on the streets and digital space trends, top designers decided to incorporate them into their collections: an example of this, is 2016 Gucci collection, created in collaboration with a famous graffiti artist, or retailers as Urban Outfitters, where streetstyle garments are sold at high-end prices.

See also 

 Trickle-down effect
 Social media
 Vivienne Westwood
 Punk fashion
 Grunge fashion
 T-Shirt

References 

Fashion